Taui Ben Kawhena Woodman (born 9 May 1960) is a former New Zealand rugby union player. A wing, Woodman represented North Auckland at a provincial level, and was a member of the New Zealand national side, the All Blacks, in 1984. He made six appearances for the All Blacks but did not play any test matches. His brother Fred Woodman was also an All Black; his daughter Portia Woodman is a New Zealand women's rugby team representative.

References

1960 births
Living people
Ngāpuhi people
People from Kaikohe
New Zealand rugby union players
New Zealand international rugby union players
Northland rugby union players
Rugby union wings
University of Auckland alumni
People educated at Northland College, Kaikohe
Rugby union players from the Northland Region